Facifica Falayfay is a 1969 Filipino movie starring Dolphy, adapted from Mars Ravelo’s series of superhero comics. A sequel, Mga Anak ni Facifica Falayfay, was released in 1987.

Plot
A young boy, Facifica (Dolphy) is raised as a girl by his mother, Aling Kobay (Dely Atay-atayan), who had been longing for a daughter. When Facifica’s mother dies, his brothers tries to teach him combat skills and how to act like a "real man." Later, he meets Pilar (Pilar Pilapil), a movie star that Facifica idolizes. He falls in love with her and feels the need to protect her.

Cast
 Dolphy as Facifica Falayfay
 Panchito
 Pilar Pilapil as Ligaya
 Rod Navarro
 Martin Marfil 
 Dely Atay-atayan

Reception
Referred to as Dolphy's ultimate queer movie, critics preferred if Facifica did not become straight and ended up as best friends with Ligaya, his leading lady.

See also
Mga Anak ni Facifica Falayfay

References

External links
 

1969 LGBT-related films
Philippine comedy films
Philippine LGBT-related films
Filipino-language films
Films directed by Luciano B. Carlos